Estadio de fútbol Farid Richa is a multi-use stadium in Barquisimeto, Venezuela. It is currently used mostly for football matches and is the home stadium of Unión Lara. The stadium holds 12,480 people and it opened in 2001.

References

External links
Photo of stadium

Farid Richa
Buildings and structures in Lara (state)